Mauser Model 1894 may refer to:
 The Brazilian Model 1894, a slightly modified Mauser Model 1893
 The Swedish Mauser Model 1894